Sonya Cortés (born February 17, 1962) is a Puerto Rican dancer, actress, comedian, singer, model, and TV and radio host. She was one of the hosts in Univision talk and variety show Anda Pa'l Cara.  Cortés is also a bachata singer. She has released three albums. As of 2007 she's also starring on stage with Francisco Gattorno and Marian Pabón in a comedy play. in 2010 she became the host of the Univision program "Locas de Atar".

In 2011, Cortés launched , and a perfume in 2017.

Career
Cortéz began her career as a television host, in the late 1990s, on a show called .

Discography

Personal life
Cortés was married to Ediel Varela.

See also
List of television presenters/Puerto Rico
List of Puerto Ricans

References

1960 births
Living people
Puerto Rican comedians
Puerto Rican female models
20th-century Puerto Rican women singers
Puerto Rican stage actresses
Puerto Rican radio personalities
Puerto Rican television actresses
Puerto Rican television personalities
21st-century American comedians
21st-century American actresses
21st-century Puerto Rican women singers